Martin Garot (born 21 March 1988) is a French footballer who plays as an attacking midfielder for Régional 1 club FC Olonne-Château.

References

External links

 

1988 births
Living people
Footballers from Le Mans
French footballers
Association football midfielders
Stade Lavallois players
La Vitréenne FC players
Les Herbiers VF players
Vendée Fontenay Foot players
Ligue 2 players
Championnat National 2 players
Championnat National 3 players
Régional 1 players